Emil Kirjas (born 26 June 1975, in Skopje) is a Macedonian politician. He served as junior minister of Foreign Affairs of the Republic of Macedonia from 2004 to 2006. He is currently a vice-president of Liberal International, the oldest political international in the world based in London, where he was one of the longest serving secretaries-general (from 2007 to 2017). In 2007 he was elected a vice-president of the Liberal Democratic Party (North Macedonia) for a mandate of 2 years. 

He is a former president of the International Federation of Liberal Youth (IFLRY), a position which he occupied from 2001 to 2005, after having served as secretary-general (1999-2001) and vice-president of the organisation. 

His career includes working for various international organisations and institutions, including the Friedrich Naumann Foundation, the Council of Europe and the Organization for Security and Co-operation in Europe. In 2017 he founded Kirjas Global Ltd. and currently advises heads of states and prominent political leaders world-wide. 

He graduated with a master's degree in Geopolitics, Territory and Security from King's College London in 2007 where he was a Chevening Scholar. He holds an engineering degree in Computer Science from the Ss. Cyril and Methodius University of Skopje.

References

1975 births
Living people
Alumni of King's College London
Government ministers of North Macedonia
Politicians from Skopje
Chevening Scholars